"Power Over Me" is a song by Irish singer-songwriter and musician Dermot Kennedy. It was released as a single on 16 October 2018 as the second single from his debut studio album Without Fear. The song also features on his compilation album Dermot Kennedy. The song peaked at number 11 on the Irish Singles Chart..

Music video
A music video to accompany the release of "Power Over Me" was first released onto YouTube on 13 November 2018.

Track listing

Personnel
Credits adapted from Tidal.
 Stephen Kozmeniuk – producer, composer, lyricist
 Dermot Kennedy – composer, lyricist
 Scott Harris – composer, lyricist
 Tony Maserati – mixer, studio personnel

Charts

Weekly charts

Year-end charts

Certifications

Release history

References

2018 songs
2018 singles
Dermot Kennedy songs
Songs written by Scott Harris (songwriter)
Songs written by Stephen Kozmeniuk
Songs written by Dermot Kennedy